Theodore Kenzo 'Teddy' Kayombo (born 25 January 1991 in Lyon) is a French born Congolese footballer, who currently plays for Limonest.

Career 
He made his debut for the Metz reserve team in the 3–1 away win over Jarville on 24 January 2010, and established himself as a second-string regular during the 2010–11 season. Kayombo played his first senior match for Metz in the 1–0 victory against Guingamp on 12 August 2011, coming on as an 82nd-minute substitute for Yohan Croizet, who was also making his debut in the match. He played only two games as substitute and was after the end of the season 2012/2013 released by Toure. He signed than in January 2014 after a half year without an club, for CFA side AS Lyon-Duchère.

References

External links
 

1991 births
Living people
Footballers from Lyon
French sportspeople of Democratic Republic of the Congo descent
Association football defenders
FC Metz players
Tours FC players
Lyon La Duchère players
AS Saint-Priest players
Ligue 2 players
Championnat National 2 players
Championnat National 3 players
French footballers
Black French sportspeople